Bryan Chiu (born August 16, 1974) is the former offensive line coach for the BC Lions of the Canadian Football League (CFL) and current head coach of Vancouver College. He was a professional Canadian football centre for the Montreal Alouettes from 1997 to 2009. He has also served as the offensive line coach for the Toronto Argonauts and Ottawa Redblacks.

High school
Chiu played football in high school for the Vancouver College Fighting Irish in Vancouver, British Columbia.

College years
Chiu started his college football career playing ball for the Pacific Tigers and transferred to Washington State when Pacific dropped its football program. He started all 11 games he played with the Washington State Cougars in 1996 and graduated in 1997 with a degree in Sports Management.

Professional career
Since joining the Montreal Alouettes in 1997 Chiu proved himself to be one of the top centres in the CFL. He was honoured as both a CFL and East Division All-Star from 2000 consecutively through to 2006 and won the Most Outstanding Lineman in 2002. Chiu was the Alouettes' Most Outstanding Linesman in both 2001 and 2002 and helped his team win the 90th Grey Cup. In 2006, he was named to the honour roll of the TSN Top 50 CFL Players. On June 6, 2010 on CFL Training Camp opening, Chiu announced his retirement after 13 seasons with the Montreal Alouettes, through his Twitter account.

Coaching years
On June 22, 2010, he joined the Concordia Stinger coaching staff as the assistant offensive coordinator and offensive line coach.

On May 9, 2014, Chiu joined the Toronto Argonauts coaching staff as their offensive line coach.

On December 23, 2014, he was named the offensive line coach of the Ottawa Redblacks.

Chiu joined the BC Lions for the 2019 season under new head coach DeVone Claybrooks. However, Chiu was released from his duties midway through the season as the team fell to 1-9 and had given up a league worst 43 sacks.

On February 8, 2022, Chiu was named the head football coach of his alma mater, the Vancouver College Fighting Irish. Chiu replaced Todd Bernett, one of the winningest coaches in BC High School Football history.

References

External links

 Official Web Site
 BC Lions bio
 

1974 births
Living people
BC Lions coaches
Canadian football offensive linemen
Canadian sportspeople of Chinese descent
Montreal Alouettes players
Ottawa Redblacks coaches
Pacific Tigers football players
Players of Canadian football from British Columbia
Canadian football people from Montreal
Canadian football people from Vancouver
Toronto Argonauts coaches
Washington State Cougars football players